Damon is a genus of whip spiders, also known as tailless whip scorpions (Amblypygi) of the family Phrynichidae.

Species
 Damon annulatipes (Wood, 1869)
 Damon brachialis Weygoldt, 1999
 Damon diadema (Simon, 1876)
 Damon gracilis Weygoldt, 1998
 Damon johnstonii (Pocock, 1894)
 Damon longispinatus Weygoldt, 1999
 Damon medius (Herbst, 1797)
 Damon sylviae Prendini, Weygoldt & Wheeler, 2005
 Damon tibialis (Simon, 1876)
 Damon uncinatus Weygoldt, 1999
 Damon variegatus C. L. Koch, 1850

References 
 Biolib
 Panarthropoda

Amblypygi
Arachnid genera